339th may refer to:

339th Aviation Detachment, United States Army Aviation Branch
339th Bombardment Group, unit of the New York Air National Guard
339th Bombardment Squadron, inactive United States Air Force unit
339th Fighter Group, unit of the United States Air Forces during World War II
339th Flight Test Squadron, United States Air Force unit
339th Infantry Regiment (United States), infantry regiment of the United States Army
339th Rifle Division (Soviet Union), formed in 1941 as a standard Red Army rifle division at Rostov-on-Don
339th Transportation Company (Direct Support), United States Army and Transportation Corps
339th Troop Carrier Squadron, component of the 419th Operations Group

See also
339 (number)
339, the year 339 (CCCXXXIX) of the Julian calendar
339 BC